Trevor Bowen (sometimes T. R. Bowen, born 1941 in Rangoon, Burma) is an English actor and screenwriter who has appeared frequently in British television dramas since the mid-1960s.

Early life
He is the son of Major General W. O. Bowen and was educated at Dulwich College, Winchester Art School and Queens' College, Cambridge, where he was president of the Marlowe Society and appeared in student productions. He then toured with the Royal Shakespeare Company and appeared in repertory theatres .

Actor
His notable television appearances include; A Family at War (1970–1972), Dickens of London (1976), Edward & Mrs. Simpson (1978) as Duff Cooper, First Among Equals (1986), The Man Who Made Husbands Jealous (1997), Judge John Deed (2001–2007) and Thatcher: The Final Days (1991) as Kenneth Baker. He also appeared in the film Darling (1965) as Julie Christie's first husband.

Writer
Bowen has been active as a television screenwriter since the 1970s, writing many episodes for television films and series, most notably Sherlock Holmes (1984) and The Inspector Alleyn Mysteries,  but also including contributions to  Bognor (1981–1982), Nanny (1983), the BBC series Agatha Christie's Miss Marple (1984–1992) (including the television movie version of The Body in the Library (1984)), Lovejoy (1991–1993), Hornblower Mutiny (2001) and Helen West (2002). He has also written several novels.

Publications 
 Punctuations, London 1971
 The Emperor's Falcon, London 1980
 The Death of Amy Parris, London 1998
 The Black Camel, London 2002

Filmography

References

External links
 

1941 births
English male television actors
English television writers
Living people
British male television writers
Alumni of Queens' College, Cambridge